Arkhan Fikri (born 28 December 2004) is an Indonesian professional footballer who plays as an attacking midfielder for Liga 1 club Arema and the Indonesia U20 national team.

Club career

Arema
Fikri was signed for Arema to play in Liga 1 in the 2022–23 season. Arkhan made his first-team debut on 13 August 2022 as a substitute in a match against Bali United at the Kapten I Wayan Dipta Stadium, Gianyar when he was 17th years old. On 24 August 2022, he became the "first-eleven" for the first time in a winning match against RANS Nusantara, substituted by Gian Zola in the second half.

International career
On 30 May 2022, Fikri made his debut for an Indonesian youth team against a Venezuela U-20 squad in the 2022 Maurice Revello Tournament in France.

On 4 July 2022, scored against Brunei U-19 in a 7–0 win in the 2022 AFF U-19 Youth Championship.

In October 2022, it was reported that Fikri received a call-up from the Indonesia U-20 for a training camp, in Turkey and Spain.

Career statistics

Club

References

External links
 
 Arkhan Fikri at Liga Indonesia

Living people
2004 births
Sportspeople from North Sumatra
Indonesian footballers
Association football midfielders
Indonesia youth international footballers
Liga 1 (Indonesia) players
PS Kwarta Deli Serdang players
Arema F.C. players